The Drag is a 1966 Canada anti-smoking animated short, animated and directed by Italian artist Carlos Marchiori and produced by Robert Verrall and Wolf Koenig for the National Film Board of Canada.

Summary
Aimed at young people, the 8 min. 37 sec. sponsored film for the former Department of National Health and Welfare offers a comical look at dangers of addiction and the difficulties of quitting through the story of a chain smoker, recounting his experiences on a psychiatrist's couch, and also explores the part that cigarette advertising—once quite common—played in getting people hooked complete with kaleidoscopic collage montages.

Awards
Calvin Workshop Awards, Kansas City, Missouri: Notable Film Award, 1966
 Columbus International Film & Animation Festival, Columbus, Ohio: Chris Certificate, 1967
 International Festival of Red Cross and Health Films, Varna, Bulgaria: Silver Medal, 1969
 39th Academy Awards, Los Angeles: Nominee: Best Short Subject, Cartoons, 1967

References

External links
Watch The Drag at NFB.ca
The Drag on YouTube

Social guidance films
1966 animated films
National Film Board of Canada animated short films
Smoking cessation
Sponsored films
Films produced by Robert Verrall
Films about smoking
1966 films
Canadian animated short films
1960s Canadian films
Collage film